Csobád is a village in Borsod-Abaúj-Zemplén County in northeastern Hungary.
, the village had a population of 679.

References

Populated places in Borsod-Abaúj-Zemplén County